Periya Marudhu is a 1994 Indian Tamil-language action film directed by N. K. Viswanathan. The film stars Vijayakanth, Ranjitha and Pragathi. It was released on 2 November 1994 during Diwali.

Plot 

Periya Marudhu amputated Marimuthu for grabbing his land and he is sent to jail. After spending two years behind bars, Periya Marudhu is back to his village.

In the past, Periya Marudhu became orphan at a very early age and tried hard to live through. Impressed by Periya Marudhu's strength, Sivasankaran brought him at his home. Since then, Periya Marudhu considers Sivasankaran as his best friend and works as his faithful henchman while Sivasankaran considers him as his common henchman. Sivasankaran is involved in land grabbing, in women kidnapping and raping. The villagers hate Sivasankaran and Periya Marudhu.

After losing her sister, Kaveri decides to live with Periya Marudhu, her last relative. Kaveri loves Periya Marudhu and tries to change his behaviour. Sivasankaran, who fears to lose his faithful henchman, kills Kaveri.

Periya Marudhu decides to take revenge and becomes a good man.

Cast 

Vijayakanth as Periya Marudhu
Ranjitha as Kaveri
Pragathi as Ponni
Mahesh Anand as Sivasankaran
M. N. Nambiar as Bhai
Pandiyan as Pandiyan
Thalaivasal Vijay as Marimuthu
Goundamani as Sodalai
Senthil as Azhaguraman
S. S. Chandran as S. Satyamurthy
Ponnambalam as Senkodan
Peeli Sivam as Police Inspector
C. R. Vijayakumari as Periya Marudhu's mother
Ganthimathi
Karuppu Subbiah
Ram
Lakshman
Sangili Murugan as Periya Marudhu's father
K. A. Thangavelu
M. Saroja
V. Gopalakrishnan as Jailer
Aradhana as Mahalakshmi
Jayalalita as Sevvanthi
Kullamani as Perichali
Omakuchi Narasimhan
Idichapuli Selvaraj as Restaurant Owner
Ganapathy Subramaniam
Ashwin Kumar
Kavithasri as an item number

Soundtrack 
The soundtrack was composed by Ilaiyaraaja, with lyrics written by  Vaali, Pulamaipithan, Muthulingam and Ponnadiyan.

Critical reception 
The Indian Express wrote, "The screenplay is loosely etched and treatment leaves much to be desired." Thulasi of Kalki called comedy and dialogues as okay while calling music and cinematography as enjoyable and concluded that if one was an action lover, this film is for them.

References

External links 

1990s Tamil-language films
1994 action films
1994 films
Films directed by N. K. Vishwanathan
Films scored by Ilaiyaraaja
Indian action films